Lophosia is a genus of flies in the family Tachinidae.

Species
L. aenescens (Malloch, 1931) 
L. angusticauda (Townsend, 1927)
L. atra (Townsend, 1926)
L. bicincta (Robineau-Desvoidy, 1830)
L. caudalis Sun, 1996
L. costalis (Townsend, 1926)
L. epalpata (Townsend, 1927)
L. erythropa (Bezzi, 1925)
L. excisa Tothill, 1918
L. exquisita (Malloch, 1931) 
L. fasciata Meigen, 1824
L. felderi (Brauer & von Bergenstamm, 1893) 
L. flavicornis Sun, 1996
L. hamulata (Villeneuve, 1926)
L. imbecilla Herting, 1983
L. imbuta (Wiedemann, 1819)
L. jiangxiensis Sun, 1996
L. lophosioides (Townsend, 1927)
L. macropyga Herting, 1983
L. marginata Sun, 1996
L. obscura (Brauer & von Bergenstamm, 1893) 
L. ocypterina (Villeneuve, 1927)
L. perpendicularis (Villeneuve, 1927)
L. pulchra (Townsend, 1927)
L. scutellata Sun, 1996
L. tianmushanica Sun, 1996

References

Phasiinae
Diptera of Europe
Diptera of Asia
Tachinidae genera
Taxa named by Johann Wilhelm Meigen